The Dominican Republic Handball Federation (DRHF) is the administrative and controlling body for handball and beach handball in Dominican Republic. Founded in 1982, DRHF is a member of North America and the Caribbean Handball Confederation (NACHC) and the International Handball Federation (IHF).

National teams
 Dominican Republic men's national handball team
 Dominican Republic men's national junior handball team
 Dominican Republic women's national handball team

References

External links
 Official website  
 Dominican Republic at the IHF website.
 Dominican Republic  at the NACHC website.

Handball in the Dominican Republic
Handball
Sports organizations established in 1982
1982 establishments in the Dominican Republic
Handball governing bodies
Dominican Republic
National members of the International Handball Federation